A religious colloquy is a meeting to settle differences of doctrine or dogma, also called a colloquium (meeting, discussion), as in the historical Colloquy at Poissy, and like the legal colloquy, most often with a certain degree of judging involved. Religious colloquies are relatively common as a means to avoid calling full synods and avoiding out-and-out breaches leading to schisms.

Colloquy may also be defined as the conversation of prayer with God, a private opportunity with God the Father, to plead one's need for assistance, reassurance or forgiveness. St. Gregory of Nyssa is quoted as saying "Prayer is conversation, and colloquy with God."

Further reading 
 Otto Scheib: Die innerchristlichen Religionsgespräche im Abendland. Regionale Verbreitung, institutionelle Gestalt, theologische Themen, kirchenpolitische Funktion. Mit besonderer Berücksichtigung des konfessionellen Zeitalters (1517 - 1689). (Wolfenbütteler Forschungen; Bd. 122) Wiesbaden: Harrassowitz, 2009,  (in German)

History of Christian theology
Church councils